

Herefrith was a medieval Bishop of Winchester. He was consecrated before 825. He died in 836. However, he never appears on charters except with Wigthegn.

Citations

References

External links
 

Bishops of Winchester
836 deaths
9th-century English bishops
Year of birth unknown